Denis Grbić (born 15 March 1986) is a Slovenian footballer who plays as a striker.

External links
Player profile at Prvaliga 

1986 births
Living people
People from Velenje
Slovenian footballers
Association football midfielders
NK Rudar Velenje players
Slovenian PrvaLiga players
Croatian Football League players
NK Istra 1961 players
Zalaegerszegi TE players
Slovenian expatriate footballers
Expatriate footballers in Croatia
Expatriate footballers in Hungary
Slovenian expatriate sportspeople in Croatia
Slovenian expatriate sportspeople in Hungary